The water bowline is a type of knot designed for use in wet conditions where other knots may slip or jam.

Although similar in finished appearance to the double bowline, the water bowline is formed with a clove hitch as the loop in the standing part of the rope. This is similar to the double bowline, which puts the running end through a round turn. The additional friction from the clove hitch increases the security of this knot.

The Water Bowline can be tied very quickly by throwing two half hitches over the working end and then running the working end around the standing line and back through both half hitches. This is illustrated in the three pictures below.

See also
List of knots

External links
Water bowline knot